= Hope Sculpture =

Concrete sculpture

The Hope Sculpture by Steuart Padwick was built as a legacy piece for COP26 in Glasgow in 2021.

Everything used to build the sculpture is reclaimed, recycled or sustainable. It is the UK's first cement-free concrete superstructure, with a carbon footprint 70% smaller than the footprint from regular concrete. Reclaimed steel gas pipes were used for the piling and recycled glass from Dryen Aqua was used as part of the aggregates for the child at the top.

The design was inspired by the chimney stalks that littered the East End of Glasgow during the mid-1800s; however, instead of smoke billowing from the top of the slim 20-metre-high columns, there is an "age, gender, race neutral child" shown as if "reaching out to a greener, hopeful, positive future".
